Welcome to O'Block is the debut studio album by American rapper King Von and the only one to be released during his lifetime. It was released on October 30, 2020, through Only the Family and Empire Distribution. Welcome to O'Block was released just a week before King Von was shot and killed on November 6, 2020. The album features chief production from Chopsquad DJ and guest appearances from Dreezy, Fivio Foreign, Lil Durk, Moneybagg Yo, Polo G and Prince Dre. It peaked at number 5 on the Billboard 200, after his death. 

Von explained the key difference between his mixtape Levon James and Welcome to O'Block: "If you're doing something and keep doing it, you're gonna get better results. Everything better. It is the one for real, I've been working hard. Complex said the album sees Von "reflecting with an acute lyrical clarity on his rise and how newfound fame could impact his own life and the lives of his loved ones", while Revolt noted of the drill album: "Often rapping about Chicago and his well-respected neighborhood, this album most certainly paints the vivid picture of his cinematic lyrics while portraying his stand-out cadences through each record".

Singles
"Why He Told", the lead single from the album, was released on July 24, 2020, along with a music video.

"All These Niggas", the second single from the album, was released on August 5, 2020, with an accompanying music video. The song features Lil Durk.

"How It Go", the third single from the album, was released on August 28, 2020.

"I Am What I Am", the fourth single from the album, was released on October 9, 2020. It features a guest appearance from Fivio Foreign.

"Gleesh Place", the fifth single from the album, was released on October 23, 2020.

"The Code" was released on October 30, 2020, alongside the album and a music video. It features a guest appearance from Polo G.

Track listing

Notes
  Signifies an uncredited co-producer

Charts

Weekly charts

Year-end charts

Certifications

References

2020 albums
Empire Distribution albums
King Von albums